Lagunitas-Forest Knolls is a census-designated place, composed of two unincorporated areas in the western half of the San Geronimo Valley in Marin County, California. It is located to the west of San Geronimo and Woodacre. The population was 1,924 at the 2020 census.

The two towns are locally seen as separate. Geographically divided by narrow points in the San Geronimo Valley, each has its own small commercial center. Both towns are primarily residential. The ZIP code of Lagunitas is 94938, while the ZIP code of Forest Knolls is 94933.

Geography
Lagunitas-Forest Knolls is located at  (38.015064, -122.693874).

San Geronimo Creek (a.k.a. Paper Mill Creek), one of the few remaining spawning grounds for Coho salmon (Oncorhynchus kisutch), runs through both towns. Lagunitas Creek, a tributary to San Geronimo Creek, is home to the largest remaining wild run of Coho salmon in Central California. These Coho are part of the Central California Coast Evolutionarily Significant Unit (CCC ESU), and are listed as "endangered" at both the state and federal level.

The towns line the western end of the San Geronimo Valley, extending into the forested south ridges and slightly into the grassier northern ones.

Lagunitas is on the eastern border of Samuel P. Taylor State Park.  Like the park, Lagunitas-Forest Knolls and the surrounding environs are lushly vegetated with large areas of coniferous forests.

Hiking and horseback riding are popular in the hills above the towns.

Demographics

2010
At the 2010 census Lagunitas-Forest Knolls had a population of 1,819. The racial makeup of Lagunitas-Forest Knolls was 1,658 (91.1%) White, 26 (1.4%) African American, 11 (0.6%) Native American, 11 (0.6%) Asian, 1 (0.1%) Pacific Islander, 43 (2.4%) from other races, and 69 (3.8%) from two or more races. Hispanic or Latino of any race were 133 people (7.3%).

The census reported that 99.5% of the population lived in households and 0.5% lived in non-institutionalized group quarters.

There were 817 households, 213 (26.1%) had children under the age of 18 living in them, 354 (43.3%) were opposite-sex married couples living together, 86 (10.5%) had a female householder with no husband present, 40 (4.9%) had a male householder with no wife present.  There were 57 (7.0%) unmarried opposite-sex partnerships, and 10 (1.2%) same-sex married couples or partnerships. 259 households (31.7%) were one person and 45 (5.5%) had someone living alone who was 65 or older. The average household size was 2.22.  There were 480 families (58.8% of households); the average family size was 2.78.

The age distribution was 342 people (18.8%) under the age of 18, 94 people (5.2%) aged 18 to 24, 339 people (18.6%) aged 25 to 44, 808 people (44.4%) aged 45 to 64, and 236 people (13.0%) who were 65 or older.  The median age was 48.9 years. For every 100 females, there were 94.8 males.  For every 100 females age 18 and over, there were 97.5 males.

The homeowner vacancy rate was 1.6%; the rental vacancy rate was 3.2%. 71.4% of the population lived in owner-occupied housing units and 28.1% lived in rental housing units.

2000
At the 2000 census there were 1,835 people, 745 households, and 475 families in the CDP. The racial makeup of the CDP in 2010 was 87.0% non-Hispanic White, 1.4% non-Hispanic African American, 0.2% Native American, 0.5% Asian, 0.1% Pacific Islander, 0.5% from other races, and 3.0% from two or more races. Hispanic or Latino of any race were 7.3%.

Of the 745 households 35.2% had children under the age of 18 living with them, 45.1% were married couples living together, 12.6% had a female householder with no husband present, and 36.2% were non-families. 26.3% of households were one person and 3.0% were one person aged 65 or older.  The average household size was 2.43 and the average family size was 2.87.

The age distribution was 24.2% under the age of 18, 5.2% from 18 to 24, 29.6% from 25 to 44, 35.4% from 45 to 64, and 5.6% 65 or older.  The median age was 41 years. For every 100 females, there were 97.7 males.  For every 100 females age 18 and over, there were 96.5 males.

The median household income was $55,917 and the median family income  was $72,411. Males had a median income of $60,035 versus $40,625 for females. The per capita income for the CDP was $31,504.  About 4.1% of families and 6.0% of the population were below the poverty line, including 3.4% of those under age 18 and 2.0% of those age 65 or over.

References

Census-designated places in Marin County, California
West Marin
Census-designated places in California